The Freedom Trap is a novel written by English author Desmond Bagley, and was first published in 1971 with a cover by Norman Weaver. It was loosely based on the escape of George Blake from prison five years before. In 1973 it was made into a film entitled The Mackintosh Man, starring Paul Newman.

Plot introduction
Joseph Rearden is a better-than-average crook from South Africa with a jail conviction on his record. In London, he meets an agent of the British Government called Mackintosh, who recruits him for a new and deadly assignment - to snare The Scarperers (a notorious gang of criminals who organise gaol-breaking for long-term prisoners) and Slade, a notorious Russian double agent whom they have recently liberated. Rearden is asked to rob a postman with a package of uncut diamonds, for which he will be caught and sent to jail in the hope that this will attract the attention of the Scarperers. Thinking that this will be an easy score, Rearden accepts. He is successful, but finds that he has been freed by the Scarperers to help fulfil their own evil political agenda. The trail goes to Malta, where Rearden must outwit the Scarperers in order to save his own life.

Bagley carried over the Slade character from Running Blind.

External links
Crime Time review of Desmond Bagley
Fantastic Fiction site with publication history

1971 British novels
Novels by Desmond Bagley
Novels set in Malta
British novels adapted into films
William Collins, Sons books